Dongliao County is a county of western Jilin province, Northeast China. It is under the administration of Liaoyuan City. County has its name because there is an origin of Dongliao River.

Administrative Divisions
Towns: Baiquan, Liaoheyuan, Weijin, Anshu, Pinggang, Quantai, Jian'an, Anshi, Yunshun.

Townships: Lingyun Township, Jiashan Township, Zumin Township, Jinzhou Township.

References

External links

County-level divisions of Jilin